Alan Edwards (21 October 1943 – July 2002) was a British sprint canoer who competed in the late 1960s. He was eliminated in the semifinals of the K-4 1000 m event at the 1968 Summer Olympics in Mexico City.

During his time at Worcester Canoe Club, he built the current club building in his free time.

He died in July 2002 after battling bowel cancer.

References
Sports-reference.com profile

Canoeists at the 1968 Summer Olympics
Olympic canoeists of Great Britain
British male canoeists
1943 births
2002 deaths
Deaths from colorectal cancer
Deaths from cancer in the United Kingdom